The  broad gauge Trans-Aral Railway (also known as the Tashkent Railway) was built in 1906 connecting Kinel and Tashkent, then both in the Russian Empire. For the first part of the 20th century it was the only railway connection between European Russia and Central Asia.

An extensive description of the newly built railway was published in 1910.

Construction history

There were plans to construct the Orenburg–Tashkent line as early as 1874. Construction work did not start, however, until the autumn of 1900. The railway was simultaneously built from both ends toward a common junction. It opened in January 1906, linking the existing network of Russian and European railways to the Trans-Caspian Railway.

On January 1, 1905, the Kinel–Orenburg section of the Samara–Zlatoust line was joined to the Tashkent railway.

The Kinel–Tashkent Railway was the first line to be built across the steppe, replacing the multiple routes once used by caravans with a single, steel path. It introduced the Kazakhs to industrial modernity and tied the distant Governor-Generalship of Turkestan more firmly to the Russian metropole, allowing troops to be rushed to Central Asia and raw cotton to be exported to Moscow's textile mills.

Economic impact
Because of the American Civil War, cotton shot up in price in the 1860s, becoming an increasingly important commodity in the region, although its cultivation was on a much lesser scale than during the Soviet period. The cotton trade led to the construction of these railroads. In the long term, the development of a cotton monoculture would render Turkestan dependent on food imports from Western Siberia, and the Turkestan–Siberia Railway was already planned when the First World War broke out.

Post-revolutionary period
After the revolution the line was blocked by Cossacks under the command of Ataman Dutov. Cut off from food supplies, and unable to sustain itself due to forced cotton cultivation, Russian Turkestan experienced an intense famine. The temporary loss of the Trans-Aral also allowed the Tashkent Soviet a degree of autonomy from Moscow during the period immediately following the Bolshevik takeover, which resulted in atrocities like the Kokand Massacre, in which between 5,000 and 14,000 people were killed.

Route
The line passes through several notable cities in Kazakhstan, including Aktobe, Aral, Qyzylorda, Turkistan, and Shymkent. It connects at Arys with the Turkestan–Siberia rail line toward Almaty, eastern Kazakhstan, and south Siberia.

See also

Turkestan–Siberia Railway
Trans-Caspian Railway

References

Literature
 Hopkirk, Peter, (1984) Setting the East ablaze : Lenin's dream of an empire in Asia, 252 pp., London: John Murray

Railway lines in Russia
Railway lines in Kazakhstan
Rail transport in Uzbekistan
Railway lines opened in 1906
Orenburg
Tashkent
1906 establishments in the Russian Empire